The School of Public and International Affairs, also referred to as SPIA, is a political science, international affairs and public policy school within The University of Georgia (UGA) in Athens, Georgia, United States.  It is the fourth ranked public affairs school in the United States.

History
The School became a standalone entity in 2001 when the department of political science separated from the Franklin College of Arts and Sciences which had been founded in 1801. Since then, the School has added two additional departments (international affairs and public administration and policy). The Master of Public Administration program of SPIA which began in 1966 in Franklin College is currently ranked third in the nation by U.S. News & World Report, according to their 2023 rankings. The school boasts 50 full-time faculty members and has produced 11,000 alumni since its founding. Most notably, it produced two Rhodes Scholars in 2008.

Departments and centers
The following departments are part of the School:
 Department of International Affairs
 Department of Political Science
 Department of Public Administration and Policy
The following centers are part of the School:
 The Center for International Trade and Security (CITS) 
 The Center for the Study of Global Issues (GLOBIS)
 SPIA Survey Research Center

Degrees offered

Undergraduate degrees
The following undergraduate degrees are offered by the School:
 Bachelor of Arts (A.B.) in Political Science
 Bachelor of Arts (A.B.) in International Affairs
 Joint Bachelor of Arts (A.B.) in Criminal Justice Studies (with Franklin College of Arts and Sciences)

Graduate degrees
The following graduate degrees are offered by the School:
 Master of Arts (M.A.) in Political Science
 Master of Public Administration (M.P.A.)
 Master of International Policy (M.I.P.)
 Ph.D. in Public Administration
 Ph.D. in Political Science

References

 
 UNDERGRADUATE AND PROFESSIONAL DEGREES OFFERED BY THE UNIVERSITY OF GEORGIA, UGA Bulletin
 Georgia Magazine, March 2006 Vol 84: No. 3

School of Public and International Affairs, University of Georgia
Public administration schools in the United States
Public policy schools
Schools of international relations in the United States
2001 establishments in Georgia (U.S. state)
Educational institutions established in 2001